A by-election was held for the Selangor State Assembly seat of Kajang on 23 March 2014 following the nomination day on 11 March 2014. The seat was vacated after the incumbent assemblyman, Lee Chin Cheh resigned on 27 January 2014. Lee was an assemblyman from the Parti Keadilan Rakyat, a component party of Pakatan Rakyat. He won by a majority of 6,824 votes against 5 other candidates in the general elections in 2013.

Federal parliamentary opposition leader Anwar Ibrahim had confirmed to stand as the Pakatan Rakyat candidate in the by-election. However, due to the unusually swift conviction by the Court of Appeal in his sodomy case, his wife Wan Azizah Wan Ismail replaced him as the PR candidate. Barisan Nasional, which forms the opposition in the Selangor Assembly, named MCA vice president and former Petaling Jaya Utara MP Chew Mei Fun as their candidate.

The by-election was won by Dr Wan Azizah with a majority of 5,379 votes. The turnout in this by-election decreased by 16% from the general election in 2013.

Results

See also
 Kajang Move

References 

Politics of Selangor
2014 elections in Malaysia
2014 Kajang by-election
By-election 2014
Elections in Selangor